Madrepora (Spanish, "mother of pores") is a genus of stony corals, often found forming reefs or islands in tropical locations. The names Madrepore and Madreporaria were formerly applied universally to any stony coral of the family Scleractinia. They reproduce in three separate ways, as discovered by the marine zoologist Anne Thynne (1800–1866). It is commonly known as horn coral. A colony is branched with small polyps in cylindrical cups separated by a perforated coenosteum. Terminal polyps bear six tentacles, while lateral polyps bear twelve tentacles. Madrepora is economically important, since it contributes to the formation of coral reefs.

Species
Species include:
 Madrepora arbuscula (Moseley, 1881)
 Madrepora astroites Forskål, 1775
 Madrepora carolina (Pourtalès, 1871)
 Madrepora minutiseptum Cairns & Zibrowius, 1997
 Madrepora oculata Linnaeus, 1758
 Madrepora porcellana (Moseley, 1881)
 †Madrepora trochiformis Pallas, 1766

References

Coral reefs
Oculinidae
Taxa named by Carl Linnaeus
Scleractinia genera